Devon Williams (born January 17, 1994, in Marietta, Georgia) is an American athlete competing in the decathlon. He represented his country at the 2017 World Championships in London, where he finished 10th. His sister is fellow American track and field athlete Kendell Williams.
 
His main personal bests are 8345 points in the decathlon (Athens 2017) and 6177 points in the indoor heptathlon (Gilliam, TX 2017).

Competition record

Personal bests
Outdoor
100 metres – 10.65 (-0.1 m/s) (Eugene 2017)
400 metres – 48.11 (London 2017)
1500 metres – 4:33.15 (Tuscaloosa 2016)
110 metres hurdles – 13.37 (+0.2 m/s) (Columbia 2017)
High jump – 1.98 (Eugene 2017)
Pole vault – 5.00 (Des Moines 2019)
Long jump – 7.75 (+0.0 m/s) (Athens 2017)
Shot put – 14.43 (London 2017)
Discus throw – 49.47 (Des Moines 2019)
Javelin throw – 60.74 (Des Moines 2019)
Decathlon – 8345 (Athens 2017)
Indoor
60 metres – 6.80 (Nashville 2017)
1000 metres – 2:38.59 (Lexington, VA 2018)
60 metres hurdles – 7.75 (Gilliam, TX 2017)
High jump – 1.97 (College Station, TX 2018)
Pole vault – 4.80 (Nashville 2017)
Long jump – 7.83 (Gilliam, TX 2017))
Shot put – 14.51 (Nashville 2017)
Heptathlon – 6177 (Gilliam, TX 2017)

References

External links 
 
 

1994 births
Living people
American male decathletes
Georgia Bulldogs track and field athletes
World Athletics Championships athletes for the United States
USA Outdoor Track and Field Championships winners